Nat Reeves (born 1955 in Lynchburg, Virginia) is an American jazz bassist. He resides in Hartford, Connecticut, and teaches at The Hartt School of the University of Hartford. He also performs internationally with a number of jazz artists. As a bassist, he is regarded as a precise accompanist, known for his impeccable time, deep tones and great earthy, organic sound.

Band leaders
Reeves has worked with Jackie McLean, Kenny Garrett, Joe Farnsworth, and others.

Discography

As leader
State of Emergency (482 Music, 2012)
Blue Ridge (Side Door, 2018)

As sideman
With Eric Alexander
 Live at the Keynote (Skip, 1999)
 It’s All in the Game (HighNote, 2006)
 Temple of Olympic Zeus ((HighNote, 2007)
 Revival of the Fittest (HighNote, 2009)
 Don't Follow the Crowd (HighNote, 2011)
 Recado Bossa Nova (Venus, 2015)

With Steve Davis
 Crossfire (Criss Cross, 1998)
 Portrait in Sound (Stretch, 2000)
 Dig Deep (Criss Cross, 2004)
 Update (Criss Cross, 2006)
 Alone Together (Mapleshade, 2007)
 Eloquence (Jazz Legacy, 2009)
 Gettin' It Done (PosiTone, 2012)
 For Real (PosiTone, 2014)
 Say When (Smoke Sessions, 2015)

With Joe Farnsworth
 Beautiful Friendship (Criss Cross, 1999)
 Drumspeak (CMD, 2006)
 Super Prime Time (Eighty Eight, 2012)
 My Heroes: Tributes to the Legends (Venus, 2014)

With Kenny Garrett
 Introducing Kenny Garrett (Criss Cross Jazz, 1984)
 Songbook (Warner Bros., 1997)
 Simply Said (Warner Bros., 1999)
 Seeds from the Underground (Mack Avenue, 2012)

With David Hazeltine
 Good-Hearted People (Criss Cross, 2001)
 The Jobim Songbook (Chesky, 2007)

With Randy Johnston
 Jubilation (Muse, 1992 [1994])
 Somewhere in the Night (HighNote, 1997) 
 Homage (JCurve, 2000)
 Hit and Run (HighNote, 2002)

With Harold Mabern
 Kiss of Fire (Venus, 2002)
 Don't Know Why (Venus, 2003)
 To Love and Be Loved (Smoke Sessions, 2017)

With Steve McCraven
 Sound of the Forest Boogaraboo (World McMusic, 1994) with Archie Shepp
 Bosco (EF Mic, 1996) with Archie Shepp and Arthur Blythe

With Jackie McLean
 Dynasty (Triloka, 1988)
 Rites of Passage (Triloka, 1991)
 The Jackie Mac Attack (Dreyfus, 1991)
 Rhythm of the Earth (Dreyfus, 1992)
 Hat Trick (Somethin' Else/Blue Note, 1996)
 Montreal ’88 (Hi Hat, 2018)

With 
 Yano Saori (JRoom Jazz, 2003)
 O2 (JRoom, 2004)

With others
 Mary DiPaola, Cat’s Cradle (Brownstone, 1997)
 Tom McClung, The Telling (Terieva, 1997)
 Mike DiRubbo, From the Inside Out (Sharp Nine, 1999)
 Dakota Staton, A Packet of Love Letters (HighNote, 1999)
 Michael Musillami, Archives (Playscape, 2001)
 Laird Jackson, Touched (Cap, 2002)
 Jesse van Ruller, Here and There (Criss Cross, 2002)
 Anthony Wonsey, The Thang (Sharp Nine, 2006)
 Diana Perez, It's Happenin'  (Zoho, 2008)
 Javon Jackson and We Four, Celebrating John Coltrane (Solid Jackson, 2012)
 John Webber, Down for the Count (Cellar Live, 2014)
 Jacques Lesure, Camaraderie WJ3, 2015)
 Rene McLean, Ancestral Calling: Music of the Spirit (I'Jazza, 2017)
 Jim Snidero & Jeremy Pelt, Jubilation (Savant High Note, 2018)
 Jim Snidero, Waves of Calm (Savant, 2019)

References

External links
 Nat Reeves' Official Website
 Yahoo Discography for Nat Reeves

Living people
American jazz double-bassists
Male double-bassists
1955 births
University of Hartford Hartt School faculty
21st-century double-bassists
21st-century American male musicians
American male jazz musicians